It's a Big World Out There (And I Am Scared) is an EP by American indie rock band Kurt Vile and the Violators, released on November 19, 2013 on Matador Records. The EP is the second to be credited to both Vile and his backing band, and is included on the deluxe edition of Vile's fifth studio album, Wakin on a Pretty Daze: Deluxe Daze (Post Haze).

Regarding the release, Vile noted: "It's more of like a psychedelic journey that's a companion piece to the style of [Wakin on a Pretty Daze], than an EP that just stands on its own."

Background and recording
It's a Big World Out There (And I Am Scared) was mostly recorded during the same sessions as Kurt Vile's fifth studio album, Wakin on a Pretty Daze, and includes variations on the tracks, "Never Run Away", "Snowflakes Are Dancing" and "Air Bud".

Regarding the track, "Feel My Pain", Vile noted, "[The song is a] stripped-down, ominous folk number, exceptionally meticulous in its finger-picked arrangement, [it] has since become a favorite of mine for all its rawness." He later elaborated: "I always loved ["Feel My Pain"]. And we tried to put that on [Wakin on a Pretty Daze], and we added all these tracks to it, making it more in that epic fashion. But something was lost to me, it seemed like more of a ghostly, stripped-down folk affair. So that was something of substance that I put on [the EP]."

Track listing

Personnel

Kurt Vile and the Violators
Kurt Vile – vocals, guitars, synth , ARP Odyssey , percussion , Yamaha CS-50 , slide guitar , keyboards 
Rob Laakso – bass guitar , synth programming , linn drums , percussion , drum machine 
Jesse Trbovich – electric guitar

Additional musicians
Vince Nudo – drums 
Stella Mozgawa – drums and percussion 
Michael Johnson – drums and synth 
Farmer Dave Scher – melodica 
John Agnello – drum machine and percussion

Artwork
Steve Powers – cover art
Adam Wallacavage – cover photograph

Recording
Kurt Vile – producer
Rob Laakso – producer , overdubbing , recording , mixing , engineer 
John Agnello – producer , initial drum and acoustic guitar recording , recording , engineer and mixing 
The Violators – producer 
Ted Young – assistant engineer
Bryce Gonzales – assistant engineer
Jonathan Low – assistant engineer
Greg Calbi – mastering
Steve Fallone – mastering assistant

References

2013 EPs
Kurt Vile albums
Albums produced by John Agnello
Matador Records albums